Carol Scott Carr (born 1939) is an American woman from the state of Georgia who became the center of a widely publicized debate over euthanasia when she killed her two adult sons because they were suffering from Huntington's disease.

Killing and trial
Huntington's disease first appeared in the mother of Carol Carr's husband. One of her daughters died from the disease, and a son committed suicide when he learned that he had it. Eventually, the disease left Carr's husband, Hoyt Scott, a factory worker, unable to move, swallow, or speak. He died in 1995.  By then, Carol's oldest sons, Randy and Andy, both had the disease. 

On June 8, 2002, Carr killed both men in the room they shared at SunBridge Nursing Home in Griffin, Georgia. Both men died of a single gunshot wound to the head. After the shootings, Carol Carr, who was then 63, calmly walked to the lobby and waited for police. When questioned by police on the night of the shooting, Carol Carr told them that she had killed her sons in order to end their suffering. The lead detective on the case told Lee Williams, the Griffin Daily News crime reporter who broke the story, that he classified the murders as a "mercy killing." James Scott of Hampton, Georgia, Carr's only remaining son, who by that time also suffered from Huntington's disease, supported his mother and claimed that she acted out of love, not malice. Watching his brothers suffer in agony for 20 years had taken an emotional toll on both him and his mother. "I sat there and watched them with bed sores," he said. "It's just a miserable way to live. They couldn't talk. They couldn't communicate with each other. They would mumble." James Scott also said that his mother had taken excellent care of his brothers while they resided at the nursing home, visiting frequently, changing their bed linens, and bringing them drinks.

Carr pleaded guilty to assisted suicide and was sentenced to five years in prison in early 2003.  After serving 21 months, she was released on parole in early 2004. The parole board mandated that if Carr's surviving son, James, should become ill with Huntington's disease, she would be prohibited from serving as his primary caregiver. They also stipulated that Carr must receive mental-health counseling during her period of supervision. James, was diagnosed with Huntington's in 2005 but as part of her plea bargain however, his mother was not allowed to be his caregiver.

Opinion and reaction 
Many in Carr's hometown came to her defense. Brown University Professor Jacob Appel was publicly and vocally critical of the case against Carr.  He claimed that Spalding County District Attorney Bill McBroom's decision to prosecute Carr "raises both ignorance and cruelty to new heights."

See also 
Right to die
Bioethics

References 

1939 births
Euthanasia in the United States
Living people
Huntington's disease